Narender Singh (born 17 September 1987) is an Indian former cricketer. He played four first-class matches for Delhi in 2007.

See also
 List of Delhi cricketers

References

External links
 

1987 births
Living people
Indian cricketers
Delhi cricketers
Cricketers from Delhi